Elly Ilias is a Grand Prix motorcycle racer from Malaysia. He competes in the Malaysian Cub Prix CP130 Championship.

Career statistics

By season

Races by year

References

External links
 Profile on motogp.com

Malaysian motorcycle racers
Living people
1984 births
125cc World Championship riders
People from Perlis